Woodlawn Memorial Park Cemetery, also known as the Masonic Burial Ground, is located at 1000 El Camino Real in Colma, California, and was established in 1905. 

When the former Masonic Cemetery in San Francisco closed, approximately 40,000 remains were moved to this cemetery in a project that spanned many years.

Notable burials

 Alex Anderson (1920–2010), cartoonist who created the characters of Rocky the Flying Squirrel, Bullwinkle, and Dudley Do-Right, as well as Crusader Rabbit.
 Humbert Allen Astredo (1929–2016), stage, film, and television actor; was part of the cast of the television series. Dark Shadows (1968–1971).
 Thomas Henry Blythe (1822–1883), capitalist, tycoon, property developer.
 Henry Clausen (1905–1992), lawyer, investigator; authored the Clausen Report.
 Aylett R. Cotton (1926–1912), politician, lawyer, judge, educator and miner.
 Laura Fair (1837–1919), murderer; with a notable court case due to gender.
 Etienne Guittard (1838–1899), founder of the oldest continuously family-owned chocolate company, Guittard Chocolate Company.
 James Augustus Johnson (1829–1896), politician; 14th Lieutenant Governor of California.
 Charles H. Larrabee (1820–1883), politician; member of the U.S. House of Representatives from Wisconsin for the 36th Congress (1859 to 1860); his grave was moved from the Masonic Cemetery, San Francisco.
 Robert L. Lippert (1909–1976), film producer and cinema chain owner.
 Henry Miller (1827–1916), rancher who founded the cattle firm, Miller and Lux.
 Jacob H. Neff (1830–1909), politician, served as the 22nd Lieutenant Governor of California from 1899 to 1903.
 Emperor Norton (1819–1880), real name Joshua Abraham Norton, self-proclaimed Emperor of the United States; his grave was moved from the Masonic Cemetery, San Francisco in 1934.
 José Sarria (1922–2013), LGBT political activist, who styled himself as "The Widow Norton".

See also 
 List of cemeteries in California

References 

Cemeteries in San Mateo County, California
Protected areas of San Mateo County, California
1905 establishments in California